The Impact Knockouts World Championship is a women's professional wrestling world championship owned by Impact Wrestling. It is primarily contested for in Impact's women's division, known as the Impact Knockouts. The championship debuted on October 14, 2007 at the Bound for Glory pay-per-view (PPV) event under the name TNA Knockouts Championship until the promotion changed its name in March 2017, then added the world status in 2021. 

The current champion is Mickie James, who is in her fifth reign.  Overall, there have been 61 reigns shared between 25 wrestlers, beginning with inaugural champion Gail Kim.

History

TNA Knockout
TNA Knockout, or just Knockout for short, is the term used by TNA to refer to its onscreen female performers; this is similar to TNA's main rival World Wrestling Entertainment and their Divas pseudonym. TNA's first women's accomplishment was announced at TNA's first weekly pay-per-view event on June 19, 2002. It was called the "Miss TNA" crown. The holder of the crown was determined in a lingerie battle royal on June 19, 2002, which aired on June 26, 2002. The participants in the match were Alexis Laree, Elektra, Erin Bray, Francine, Miss Joni, Sasha, Shannon, Taylor Vaughn, and Teresa Tyler. Vaughn last eliminated Elektra to win the crown. The TNA Knockout of the Year is another award in TNA given to the knockout who achieved the most or had the best run that year. The most recent Knockout of the Year was Gail Kim in 2007; no award has been given out since.

On the August 20, 2009 episode of TNA Impact!, backstage interviewer Lauren announced that TNA were planning to host an eight-team single elimination tag team tournament to crown the first TNA Knockouts Tag Team Champions. The tournament began on the following Impact! and continued on for four weeks, concluding on September 20 at TNA's No Surrender PPV event. There, the team of Sarita and Taylor Wilde defeated The Beautiful People (Madison Rayne and Velvet Sky) to become the first champions. Two DVDs on the topic of the TNA Knockouts have been released by TNA. The first was named "Knockouts: The Ladies of TNA Wrestling Vol.1" and was released on August 29, 2006. "Knocked Out: The Women of TNA Wrestling" was the second, released on October 7, 2008.

Creation

TNA first announced in early September 2007 through their TNA Mobile service that they planned to start an official women's division and debut a women's title soon. Later that month, TNA began to promote a 10 knockout gauntlet match to be held on October 14, 2007 at TNA's Bound for Glory PPV event to crown the first-ever TNA Women's Champion. At the event, Gail Kim defeated Ms. Brooks, Christy Hemme, Awesome Kong, Roxxi Laveaux, Talia Madison, Shelly Martinez, Jackie Moore, ODB, and Angel Williams to become the first champion. The championship was renamed in 2008 to the TNA Women's Knockout Championship until 2010 when it became simply known as the TNA Knockouts Championship.

Belt designs
During the championship's history, the belt has had four designs. Its first design featured a white leather strap that is covered with two small gold plates that are encrusted with silver. In the center of each plate stands a figure resembling a globe made out of gold. On the outer edge of the plate are red gems, which circle the entire plate. At the very top of the center plate is a queen's crown. The word "Knockout" does not appear anywhere on the belt.

At the end of December 2014, TNA uploaded a photo on their Instagram account, in which the Knockouts Championship has a new design, replacing the white strap with a black strap, with the red color scheme changed to blue to coincide with the company's color scheme and the plates are now fully gold thus the encrusted silver is removed. As with the previous belt, the word "Knockout" does not appear on the belt, despite its current name.

After Slammiversary XV, the Impact Knockouts Championship and the GFW Women's Championship were carried together, with the unified championship representing the lineage of the Impact Knockouts Championship. At Destination X 2017, a recoloured version of the former GFW Women's Championship was created to represent the championship. This belt was later modified to cover the GFW logo with an Impact Wrestling logo. At Redemption,  Impact revealed new championships. The Main plate has Impact Wrestling logo with the "Knockouts Champion" below the logo. On each side of the center plate is a group of four smaller silver plates, with each side featuring separate circular owl symbol and a "KO" Symbol. In 2020, a new belt was made, with red being the dominant color.

Championship Tournament(s)

Impact Knockouts Championship Tournament (2017) 
On November 23, 2017 it was announced after Gail Kim retired and vacated the Impact Knockouts Championship that it would be a 6-Women tournament to determine who would be the new Knockouts Champion where two triple threat matches will happen and one finals.

Reigns

The inaugural champion was Gail Kim, who defeated Ms. Brooks, Christy Hemme, Awesome Kong, Roxxi Laveaux, Velvet Sky, Shelly Martinez, Jackie Moore, ODB, and Angelina Love in a ten Knockout Gauntlet for the Gold match on October 24, 2007 at TNA's Bound for Glory PPV event. She also holds the record for the most reigns, with seven. Kim also holds the record for shortest reign in the title's history, during her seventh reign at  hours, while Taya Valkyrie's reign holds the record for longest in the title's history, with  days.

Mickie James is the current champion in her fifth reign. She defeated Jordynne Grace in a Title vs. Career match on January 13, 2023 at Hard to Kill in Atlanta, Georgia.

Notes

See also 
World Women's Championship (disambiguation)

References

External links
 Impact Wrestling Knockouts World Championship at Cagematch.com

Impact Knockouts
Impact Wrestling championships
Women's professional wrestling championships
2007 in professional wrestling